Judge Johnston my refer to:

Iain D. Johnston (born 1965), judge of the United States District Court for the Northern District of Illinois
Thomas E. Johnston (born 1967), judge of the United States District Court for the Southern District of West Virginia
Henry Johnston, Lord Johnston (1844–1931), Scottish judge

See also
Justice Johnston (disambiguation)
Edward Huggins Johnstone (1922–2013), judge of the United States District Court for the Western District of Kentucky